This is a list of councillors and aldermen elected or co-opted to the London County Council from its creation under the Local Government Act 1888 until 1919. There were nine triennial elections of the whole council during this period. Elections were postponed for the duration of the First World War.
Elections resumed in 1919 under new electoral boundaries and are detailed in List of members of London County Council 1919–37.

Councillors 1889–1898

Elections of councillors were held every three years. There were 118 councillors, with four elected to represent the City of London and two each for 57 electoral divisions. The divisions were identical to the constituencies for elections to the United Kingdom House of Commons that had been created by the Redistribution of Seats Act 1885.  The Progressive Party won a majority of seats in the 1889 elections, and retained it until 1907.

‡ The Lady Sandhurst (Progressive) received the second highest number of votes. However Beresford-Hope, who came third, petitioned on the grounds that a woman was not eligible to hold a seat on the county council. His petition was allowed and he was deemed elected.
¶ Previously an alderman.
§ Jane Cobden (later Mrs Fisher Unwin), although elected, as a woman was barred from voting, making it effectively vacant from 1889 to 1892.

Party strength 1889–1898

The strength of the parties on the council after each election was as follows:

Councillors 1898–1907

In 1904 the London School Board was abolished, and its responsibilities were transferred to the county council. At the 1904 election a number of outgoing school board members were elected as councillors.

¶ Previously an alderman.

Party strength 1898–1907
The strength of the parties on the council after each election was as follows:

County aldermen 1889–1913
In addition to the 118 councillors the council consisted of 19 county aldermen. Aldermen were elected by the council, and served a six-year term. Half of the aldermanic bench (nine or ten aldermen) were elected every three years following the tri-ennial council election. In the first election of aldermen in February 1889, ten of the nineteen chosen had three-year terms, retiring in 1892.

1889–1892 term

♦ Election held to fill two vacancies (Beaufoy and Morley)

1889–1895 term

1892–1898 term

‡ re-elected alderman † previously a councillor ♣ previously an alderman (as Arthur Arnold), 1889–1895

1895–1901 term

♦ Election held to fill three vacancies (Farrer, Hubbard and Lushington)

1898–1904 term

1901–1907 term

1904–1910 term

‡ re-elected alderman † previously a councillor 

♦ Election held to fill two vacancies (Mowatt and Sandhurst)

1907–1913 term

Councillors 1907–1919

In 1906 the Moderate grouping was reorganised as the Municipal Reform Party and as such gained a majority and control of the Council in the 1907 elections. Labour Party councillors were also elected for the first time independent of the Progressive Party in 1910. The elections due to be held in 1916 were postponed due to the First World War, and councillors elected in 1913 remained in office until 1919. The Elections and Registration Act 1915 gave the council the power to co-opt members to fill casual vacancies.

The first women who could clearly serve as members were elected as councillors (and as an alderman) in 1910 (Henrietta Adler, Susan Lawrence and Lady St Helier). Prior to the Qualification of Women (County and Borough Councils) Act 1907, the position was in some respects equivocal. Lady Sandhurst had been elected to the Council in 1889, but her election was challenged by petition, and the Court of Appeal ruled that a woman was ineligible for election. Jane Cobden had, however, also been elected in 1889, and Emma Cons had been elected as an alderman in 1889; neither of their elections was challenged within the requisite time limit. The Court of Appeal subsequently held, however, following Lady Sandhurst's case, that any woman who cast a vote would be voting whilst disqualified from holding office, and so liable to a financial penalty for having voted.

¶ Previously an alderman.

Party strength 1907–1919

The strength of the parties on the council after each election was as follows:

County aldermen 1910–1919

Ten aldermen were appointed in 1910 and nine in 1913 to serve a six-year term. Elections due in 1916 were postponed until 1919, and vacancies were filled by co-option.

See also
1901 London County Council election
1910 London County Council election
1913 London County Council election
List of members of London County Council 1919–37
List of members of London County Council 1937–49
List of members of London County Council 1949–65
List of chairmen of the London County Council

References 

 
London County Council